Balpyk Bi (Balpyq Bi) is a settlement and capital of Koksu District in Almaty Region of south-eastern Kazakhstan.  It is named after the Kazakh military hero Balpyk Derbisaliuly. Population:   

Located on the Koksu River, the Kyzylbulak Hydroelectric Power Plant is located in the area.

References

External links
Satellite map

Populated places in Almaty Region